Labo Yari (14 April 1942 – 18 March 2023) was a Nigerian writer and founding member of the Association of Nigerian Authors. He wrote Climate of Corruption in 1978, the first English novel published throughout Northern Nigeria.

Yari was born on 14 April 1942. He died at the Federal Teaching Hospital in Katsina on 18 March 2023, at the age of 80.

Works 
Climate of Corruption (1978), Fourth Dimension Publishing Company, Nigeria ISBN 978-156-014-2
A House in the Dark (1985), Fourth Dimension Publishing Company, Nigeria ISBN 978-156-148-3
Man of the Moment (1992), Fourth Dimension Publishing Company, Nigeria ISBN 978-156-289-7
A day without cockcrow and other stories (1999), Informart Publishers, Nigeria ISBN 978-34855-5-5
Muhamman Dikko, Emir of Katsina and his times: 1865–1944 (2007), Summit Books, Nigeria ISBN 978-194-464-1

References 

1942 births
2023 deaths
Nigerian writers
People from Katsina